Rika Rositawati (born 7 May 1997) is an Indonesian badminton player affiliated with Mutiara Cardinal Bandung club.

Achievements

BWF International Challenge/Series 
Women's doubles

  BWF International Challenge tournament
  BWF International Series tournament
  BWF Future Series tournament

References

External links 
 
 

1997 births
Living people
People from Sumedang
Sportspeople from West Java
Indonesian female badminton players
21st-century Indonesian women
20th-century Indonesian women